The Foxes of Harrow is a 1947 American adventure film directed by John M. Stahl. The film stars Rex Harrison, Maureen O'Hara, and Richard Haydn. It is based on the novel of the same name by Frank Yerby.

The film was nominated for the Academy Award for Best Production Design (Lyle R. Wheeler, Maurice Ransford, Thomas Little, Paul S. Fox).

Plot summary
In pre-Civil War New Orleans, roguish Irish gambler Stephen Fox (Rex Harrison) buys his way into society – something he couldn't do in his homeland because he is illegitimate.

Cast
 Rex Harrison as Stephen Fox
 Maureen O'Hara as Odalie 'Lilli' D'Arceneaux
 Richard Haydn as Andre LeBlanc
 Victor McLaglen as Captain Mike Farrell
 Vanessa Brown as Aurore D'Arceneaux
 Patricia Medina as Desiree
 Gene Lockhart as Viscount Henri D'Arceneaux
 Charles Irwin as Sean Fox
 Hugo Haas as Otto Ludenbach
 Dennis Hoey as Master of Harrow
 Roy Roberts as Tom Warren
 Randy Stuart as Stephen's birth mother (uncredited; her first acting role)
 Ralph Faulkner as Fencing Instructor (uncredited)
 Kenneth Washington as Achille (uncredited)
 Eugene Borden as French Auctioneer (uncredited)

Notes
The storyline is derived from the 1946 eponymous novel The Foxes of Harrow by Frank Yerby. Fox paid author Frank Yerby $150,000 for the motion picture rights to The Foxes of Harrow, which was his first novel. A December 1947 Ebony article called the figure "the biggest bonanza ever pocketed by a colored writer" and stated that the book was "the first Negro-authored novel ever bought by a Hollywood studio."

See also
 List of films featuring slavery

References

External links
 
 
 
 

1947 films
20th Century Fox films
Films based on American novels
Films directed by John M. Stahl
Films scored by David Buttolph
Films set in New Orleans
Films set in Ireland
American historical adventure films
1940s historical adventure films
Films set in the 1820s
Films set in the 1830s
1940s English-language films
1940s American films